George Enescu is a commune in Botoșani County, Western Moldavia, Romania. It is composed of five villages: Arborea, Dumeni (the commune centre), George Enescu, Popeni and Stânca.

The commune is so named because musician and composer George Enescu was born here, in the village of Liveni, renamed after him following his death in 1955.

References

Communes in Botoșani County
Localities in Western Moldavia